= Uttar Pradesh Control of Organised Crimes Act, 2017 =

Uttar Pradesh Legislative Assembly
- Enacted by: Uttar Pradesh Legislative Assembly
- Status: In force

Uttar Pradesh Control of Organised Crimes Act, 2017 (UPCOCA) is a law enacted by Uttar Pradesh state in India in 2017 to combat organized crime and terrorism.
